The Samaritan, known as Fury in the United Kingdom, is a 2012 crime drama film co-written and directed by David Weaver, and starring Samuel L. Jackson. A trailer was released on its website.

Plot
Foley gets out of prison after 25 years, for killing his best friend and grifting partner. His partner's son, Ethan, takes him to Xavier's nightclub and tries to recruit him into a grift he's planning, and Foley turns it down, saying he wants to go straight. Ethan goes to the kitchen area where Xavier is dealing with someone who has been caught stealing from him. Xavier leaves it with Ethan to recover the stolen money.
 
When his initial efforts fail, Ethan tricks Foley into sleeping with Foley's daughter, Iris, the daughter he never knew he had, he starts building a relationship with his addict daughter, but it's not a father-daughter relationship, Iris reveals that she is in financial debt to Ethan.
 
Ethan reveals to Foley that Iris is his daughter, and uses her as leverage to force him to do the job. Ethan has sent Jake to Iris's apartment to kill her, and Foley races to save her. Foley sends a battered Jake back to Xavier.

Foley visits Iris's Grandmother who confirms Iris's identity and is sickened by what he has done.

The grift is put into place, and it's revealed that Xavier is the Mark.

Foley's female accomplice is found hanging having committed suicide, Iris takes her place in the scam.

During the Grift to con Xavier out of $8 million, and after a series of altercations between Foley, Xavier, Ethan and Iris, Iris is wounded by Ethan, and it's revealed that Iris knows that Foley is her father, Ethan is shot and wounded, Xavier tries to escape but is killed by Foley. Foley returns to Iris who is again shot and mortally wounded by Ethan, Foley then kills Ethan. Foley rushes away to a doctor with his daughter who is desperate for a blood transfusion to save her life. Foley volunteers as he is a compatible blood type, but dies during the procedure.
Iris flees to a far away land, she visits a bank and checks that the money from the Grift is in her account.

Cast

 Samuel L. Jackson as Foley
 Luke Kirby as Ethan
 Ruth Negga as Iris
 Deborah Kara Unger as Helena
 Martha Burns as Gretchen
 Alan C. Peterson as Miro
 Aaron Poole as Jake
 Tom McCamus as Deacon
 Tom Wilkinson as Xavier
 Gil Bellows as Bartender Bill

Release

The film was released as Fury on April 20, 2012 in the United Kingdom. The film was released as  The Samaritan in a "pre-theatrical release" through Time Warner Cable's on-demand channel.

Reception 
On Rotten Tomatoes, the film has an approval rating of 26% based on 35 reviews, with an average rating of 4.3/10. The site's consensus reads, "The Samaritan is a ludicrous neo-noir starring a seemingly bored Samuel L. Jackson." On Metacritic, the film has a weighted average score of 37 out of 100, based on 15 critics, indicating "generally unfavorable reviews".

References

http://www.the-samaritans.net/

External links
 
 
 
 
 
 

Canadian crime drama films
2012 films
2012 crime drama films
English-language Canadian films
Incest in film
2010s English-language films
2010s Canadian films